The Genetic Discrimination Observatory (GDO) is a Montreal-based international network of researchers and other stakeholders who support the research and prevention of genetic discrimination (GD)—discrimination based on genetics or other predictive health information. Their headquarters are currently located at the Centre of Genomics and Policy at McGill University in Montreal.

Staff and funding 
The GDO staff comes from various fields such as genetics, ethics, law, sociology, and public policy. The GDO received initial funding from Genome Canada (Génome Québec in French), the Fonds de recherche du Québec – Santé, and the Network of Applied Medical Genetics (RMGA).

Projects

Forum québécois sur la discrimination génétique
In 2018, the GDO initiated its first project, the "Forum québécois sur la discrimination génétique" (Quebec forum on genetic discrimination) in Quebec.

World views
The GDO provides information about different countries and areas using interactive world views that show studies related to genetic discrimination and other categories in a live map format on the GDO's website. It is planned to cover nineteen different jurisdictions.

Case reporting
The GDO provides individuals from Canada, Mexico, the United Kingdom and the United States the opportunity to report specific cases of genetic discrimination or health-based discrimination confidentially.

See also
 Genetic discrimination

References 

Genetics organizations
McGill University
International medical and health organizations